"Dick Lips" is a song by American rock band Blink-182, released on February 28, 1998 as the third single from the group's second studio album, Dude Ranch (1997). The song was released by Grilled Cheese, a subsidiary label of Cargo Music. It was the band's final single with Cargo; "Josie" was distributed jointly through MCA before they left the label by the end of the year.

Background
"Dick Lips" was written about an experience in Tom DeLonge's high school years, in which he got kicked out of Poway High School during his junior year (1991) after being caught inebriated at a school basketball game. He then attended Rancho Bernardo High School for the remainder of his high school years. "Being kicked out of school was bad, but it was also the best thing in my life. Because none of us would be here today," DeLonge said in 2001. "Blink-182 is one million percent around today because I got kicked out of school.” The title has no real significance; it was an insult bandied around the Big Fish Studios while recording, that the band wanted to record "for posterity."

The song largely "failed to register" on international charts, in part due to the continued success of lead single "Dammit".

Composition
The song is composed in the key of A major and is set in time signature of common time with a moderately fast tempo of 124 beats per minute. DeLonge's vocal range spans from E4 to E5.

Reception
Consequence of Sound, in a 2015 top 10 of the band's best songs, ranked it as number seven, commenting, "Without delving into unnecessary details, the lyrics hint at an abusive household and a prospect of romantic longing that serves no purpose beyond the promise of 'something new.' Blink often suffered from spelling out its themes, but 'Dick Lips' represents one of those rare times they simply let the song speak for itself."

Format and track listing 
CD (1998)
 "Dick Lips" – 2:56
 "Apple Shampoo" – 2:52
 "Wrecked Him" – 2:50
 "Zulu" – 2:07

Personnel 
Blink-182
 Tom DeLonge – guitar, lead vocals
 Mark Hoppus – bass, backing vocals
 Scott Raynor – drums

Production
Mark Trombino – production, recording, mixing
Brian Gardner – mastering

References

Notes

Blink-182 songs
Songs about alcohol
Songs about school
1997 songs
1998 singles
Songs written by Mark Hoppus
Songs written by Tom DeLonge
Songs written by Scott Raynor